Egyptians are an ethnic group native to the Nile Valley in Egypt. Egyptian identity is closely tied to geography. The population is concentrated in the Nile Valley, a small strip of cultivable land stretching from the First Cataract to the Mediterranean and enclosed by desert both to the east and to the west. This unique geography has been the basis of the development of Egyptian society since antiquity.

The daily language of the Egyptians is a continuum of the local varieties of Arabic; the most famous dialect is known as Egyptian Arabic or Masri. Additionally, a sizable minority of Egyptians living in Upper Egypt speak Sa'idi Arabic, a mix between the Sahidic Coptic dialect and Arabic. Egyptians are predominantly adherents of Sunni Islam with a Shia minority and a significant proportion who follow native Sufi orders. A considerable percentage of Egyptians are Coptic Christians who belong to the Coptic Orthodox Church, whose liturgical language, Coptic, is the most recent stage of the ancient Egyptian language and is still used in prayers along with Egyptian Arabic.

Terminology 
Egyptians have received several names:

 𓂋𓍿𓀂𓁐𓏥𓈖𓆎𓅓𓏏𓊖 rmṯ n Km.t, the native Egyptian name and description of the Black Soil of the Nile Valley. In antiquity {http://www.griffith.ox.ac.uk/gri/9kemet.html}} The name is vocalized as ""  in the late (Bohairic) Coptic stage of the language during the Greco-Roman era. (""  with the plural definite article, "Black Lands").
 Egyptians, from Greek "", from "", "". Prominent Ancient Greek Geographer, Strabo, provided a folk etymology stating that "" had evolved as a compound from "" , meaning "Below the Aegean". In English, the noun "Egyptians" appears in the 14th century, in Wycliff's Bible, as Egipcions.
 Copts (قبط), also a derivative of the Greek word , Aiguptios ("Egypt, Egyptian"), that appeared under Muslim rule when it overtook Roman rule in Egypt. The term referred to the Egyptian locals, to distinguish them from the Arab rulers. Coptic was the language of the state, Christian church and people but was replaced by Arabic after the Muslim conquest. Islam became the dominant religion centuries after the Muslim conquest in Egypt. This is due to centuries of conversion from Christianity to Islam. The modern term then became exclusively associated with Egyptian Christianity and Coptic Christians who are members of the Coptic Orthodox Church or Coptic Catholic Church. References to native Muslims as Copts are attested until the Mamluk period.
 Masryeen, the modern Egyptian Arabic name, which comes from the ancient Semitic name for Egypt. The term originally connoted "Civilization" or "Metropolis". Classical Arabic  (Egyptian Arabic ) is directly cognate with the Biblical Hebrew Mitsráyīm (מִצְרַיִם / מִצְרָיִם), meaning "the two straits", a reference to the predynastic separation of Upper and Lower Egypt. Also mentioned in several Semitic languages as Mesru, Misir and Masar. The term "Misr" in Arabic refers to Egypt, but sometimes also to the Cairo area, as a consequence, and because of the habit of identifying people with cities rather than countries (i.e. Tunis (capital of Tunisia), Tunsi). The term Masreyeen originally referred only to the native inhabitants of Cairo or "City of Misr" before its meaning expanded to encompass all Egyptians. Edward William Lane, writing in the 1820s, said that the native Muslim inhabitants of Cairo commonly call themselves ,  (lit. The People of Masr). He also added that the Ottoman rulers of the region "stigmatized" the people of Egypt with the name  or the 'People of the Pharaoh'.

Demographics

There are an estimated 92.1 million Egyptians. Most are native to Egypt, where Egyptians constitute around 99.6% of the population.

Approximately 84–90% of the population of Egypt are Muslim adherents and 10–15% are Christian adherents (10–15% Coptic Christian, 1% other Christian Sects (mainly Greek Orthodox)) according to estimates. Most of Egypt’s people live along the banks of the Nile River, and more than two-fifths of the population lives in urban areas. Along the Nile, the population density is one of the highest in the world, in excess of 5,000 persons per square mile (2,000 per square km) in a number of riverine governorates. The rapidly growing population is young, with roughly one-third of the total under age 15 and about three-fifths under 30. In response to the strain put on Egypt’s economy by the country’s burgeoning population, a national family planning program was initiated in 1964, and by the 1990s it had succeeded in lowering the birth rate. Improvements in health care also brought the infant mortality rate well below the world average by the turn of the 21st century. Life expectancy averages about 72 years for men and 74 years for women. Egyptians also form smaller minorities in neighboring countries, North America, Europe and Australia.

Egyptians also tend to be provincial, meaning their attachment extends not only to Egypt but to the specific provinces, towns and villages from which they hail. Therefore, return migrants, such as temporary workers abroad, come back to their region of origin in Egypt. According to the International Organization for Migration, an estimated 2.7 million Egyptians live abroad and contribute actively to the development of their country through remittances (US$7.8 billion in 2009), circulation of human and social capital, as well as investment. Approximately 70% of Egyptian migrants live in Arab countries (923,600 in Saudi Arabia, 332,600 in Libya, 226,850 in Jordan, 190,550 in Kuwait with the rest elsewhere in the region) and the remaining 30% are living mostly in Europe and North America (318,000 in the United States, 110,000 in Canada and 90,000 in Italy).

A sizable Egyptian diaspora did not begin to form until well into the 1980s, when political and economic conditions began driving Egyptians out of the country in significant numbers. Today, the diaspora numbers nearly 4 million (2006 est). Generally, those who emigrate to the United States and western European countries tend to do so permanently, with 93% and 55.5% of Egyptians (respectively) settling in the new country. On the other hand, Egyptians migrating to Arab countries almost always only go there with the intention of returning to Egypt; virtually none settle in the new country on a permanent basis.

Prior to 1974, only few Egyptian professionals had left the country in search for employment. Political, demographic and economic pressures led to the first wave of emigration after 1952. Later more Egyptians left their homeland first after the 1973 boom in oil prices and again in 1979, but it was only in the second half of the 1980s that Egyptian migration became prominent.

Egyptian emigration today is motivated by even higher rates of unemployment, population growth and increasing prices. Political repression and human rights violations by Egypt's ruling régime are other contributing factors (see ). Egyptians have also been impacted by the wars between Egypt and Israel, particularly after the Six-Day War in 1967, when migration rates began to rise. In August 2006, Egyptians made headlines when 11 students from Mansoura University failed to show up at their American host institutions for a cultural exchange program in the hope of finding employment.

Egyptians in neighboring countries face additional challenges. Over the years, abuse, exploitation and/or ill-treatment of Egyptian workers and professionals in the Arab states of the Persian Gulf, Iraq and Libya have been reported by the Egyptian Human Rights Organization and different media outlets. Arab nationals have in the past expressed fear over an "'Egyptianization' of the local dialects and culture that were believed to have resulted from the predominance of Egyptians in the field of education" (see also Egyptian Arabic – Geographics).

The Egyptians for their part object to what they call the "" of their culture due to Saudi Arabian petrodollar-flush investment in the Egyptian entertainment industry. Twice Libya was on the brink of war with Egypt due to mistreatment of Egyptian workers and after the signing of the peace treaty with Israel. When the Gulf War ended, Egyptian workers in Iraq were subjected to harsh measures and expulsion by the Iraqi government and to violent attacks by Iraqis returning from the war to fill the workforce.

History

Ancient Egypt

Ancient Egypt saw a succession of thirty dynasties spanning three millennia. During this period, Egyptian culture underwent significant development in terms of religion, arts, language and customs.

Egypt fell under Hyksos rule in the Middle Bronze Age. The native nobility managed to expel the conquerors by the Late Bronze Age, thereby initiating the New Kingdom. During this period, the Egyptian civilization rose to the status of an empire under Pharaoh Thutmose III of the 18th Dynasty. It remained a super-regional power throughout the Amarna Period as well as during the 19th and 20th dynasties (the Ramesside Period), lasting into the Early Iron Age.

The Bronze Age collapse that had afflicted the Mesopotamian empires reached Egypt with some delay, and it was only in the 11th century BC that the Empire declined, falling into the comparative obscurity of the Third Intermediate Period of Egypt. The 25th Dynasty of Nubian rulers was again briefly replaced by native nobility in the 7th century BC, and in 525 BC, Egypt fell under Persian rule.

Then fell under greeks when Alexander the Great conquered Egypt in 332 BC. The Late Period of ancient Egypt is taken to end with his death in 323 BC. The Ptolemaic dynasty ruled Egypt from 305 BC to 30 BC and introduced Hellenic culture to Egyptians. 4,000 Celtic mercenaries under Ptolemy II had even attempted an ambitious but doomed coup d'état around the year 270 BC.

Throughout the Pharaonic epoch (viz., from 2920 BC to 525 BC in conventional Egyptian chronology), divine kingship was the glue which held Egyptian society together. It was especially pronounced in the Old Kingdom and Middle Kingdom and continued until the Roman conquest. The societal structure created by this system of government remained virtually unchanged up to modern times.

The role of the king was considerably weakened after the 20th Dynasty. The king in his role as Son of Ra was entrusted to maintain Ma'at, the principle of truth, justice, and order, and to enhance the country's agricultural economy by ensuring regular Nile floods. Ascendancy to the Egyptian throne reflected the myth of Horus who assumed kingship after he buried his murdered father Osiris. The king of Egypt, as a living personification of Horus, could claim the throne after burying his predecessor, who was typically his father. When the role of the king waned, the country became more susceptible to foreign influence and invasion.

The attention paid to the dead, and the veneration with which they were held, were one of the hallmarks of ancient Egyptian society. Egyptians built tombs for their dead that were meant to last for eternity. This was most prominently expressed by the Great Pyramids. The ancient Egyptian word for tomb  means 'House of Eternity'. The Egyptians also celebrated life, as is shown by tomb reliefs and inscriptions, papyri and other sources depicting Egyptians farming, conducting trade expeditions, hunting, holding festivals, attending parties and receptions with their pet dogs, cats and monkeys, dancing and singing, enjoying food and drink, and playing games. The ancient Egyptians were also known for their engaging sense of humor, much like their modern descendants.

Another important continuity during this period is the Egyptian attitude toward foreigners—those they considered not fortunate enough to be part of the community of rmṯ or "the people" (i.e., Egyptians.) This attitude was facilitated by the Egyptians' more frequent contact with other peoples during the New Kingdom when Egypt expanded to an empire that also encompassed Nubia through Jebel Barkal and parts of the Levant.

The Egyptian sense of superiority was given religious validation, as foreigners in the land of Ta-Meri (Egypt) were anathema to the maintenance of Maat—a view most clearly expressed by the admonitions of Ipuwer in reaction to the chaotic events of the Second Intermediate Period. Foreigners in Egyptian texts were described in derogatory terms, e.g., 'wretched Asiatics' (Semites), 'vile Kushites' (Nubians), and 'Ionian dogs' (Greeks). Egyptian beliefs remained unchallenged when Egypt fell to the Hyksos, Assyrians, Libyans, Persians and Greeks—their rulers assumed the role of the Egyptian Pharaoh and were often depicted praying to Egyptian gods.

The ancient Egyptians used a solar calendar that divided the year into 12 months of 30 days each, with five extra days added. The calendar revolved around the annual Nile Inundation (akh.t), the first of three seasons into which the year was divided. The other two were Winter and Summer, each lasting for four months. The modern Egyptian fellahin calculate the agricultural seasons, with the months still bearing their ancient names, in much the same manner.

The importance of the Nile in Egyptian life, ancient and modern, cannot be overemphasized. The rich alluvium carried by the Nile inundation was the basis of Egypt's formation as a society and a state. Regular inundations were a cause for celebration; low waters often meant famine and starvation. The ancient Egyptians personified the river flood as the god Hapy and dedicated a Hymn to the Nile to celebrate it. km.t, the Black Land, was as Herodotus observed, "the gift of the river."

Graeco-Roman period

When Alexander died, a story began to circulate that Nectanebo II was Alexander's father. This made Alexander in the eyes of the Egyptians a legitimate heir to the native pharaohs. The new Ptolemaic rulers, however, exploited Egypt for their own benefit and a great social divide was created between Egyptians and Greeks. The local priesthood continued to wield power as they had during the Dynastic age. Egyptians continued to practice their religion undisturbed and largely maintained their own separate communities from their foreign conquerors. The language of administration became Greek, but the mass of the Egyptian population was Egyptian-speaking and concentrated in the countryside, while most Greeks lived in Alexandria and only few had any knowledge of Egyptian.

The Ptolemaic rulers all retained their Greek names and titles, but projected a public image of being Egyptian pharaohs. Much of this period's vernacular literature was composed in the demotic phase and script of the Egyptian language. It was focused on earlier stages of Egyptian history when Egyptians were independent and ruled by great native pharaohs such as Ramesses II. Prophetic writings circulated among Egyptians promising expulsion of the Greeks, and frequent revolts by the Egyptians took place throughout the Ptolemaic period. A revival in animal cults, the hallmark of the Predyanstic and Early Dyanstic periods, is said to have come about to fill a spiritual void as Egyptians became increasingly disillusioned and weary due to successive waves of foreign invasions.

When the Romans annexed Egypt in 30 BC, the social structure created by the Greeks was largely retained, though the power of the Egyptian priesthood diminished. The Roman emperors lived abroad and did not perform the ceremonial functions of Egyptian kingship as the Ptolemies had. The art of mummy portraiture flourished, but Egypt became further stratified with Romans at the apex of the social pyramid, Greeks and Jews occupied the middle stratum, while Egyptians, who constituted the vast majority, were at the bottom. Egyptians paid a poll tax at full rate, Greeks paid at half-rate and Roman citizens were exempt.

The Roman emperor Caracalla advocated the expulsion of all ethnic Egyptians from the city of Alexandria, saying "genuine Egyptians can easily be recognized among the linen-weavers by their speech." This attitude lasted until AD 212 when Roman citizenship was finally granted to all the inhabitants of Egypt, though ethnic divisions remained largely entrenched. The Romans, like the Ptolemies, treated Egypt like their own private property, a land exploited for the benefit of a small foreign elite. The Egyptian peasants, pressed for maximum production to meet Roman quotas, suffered and fled to the desert.

The cult of Isis, like those of Osiris and Serapis, had been popular in Egypt and throughout the Roman Empire at the coming of Christianity, and continued to be the main competitor with Christianity in its early years. The main temple of Isis remained a major center of worship in Egypt until the reign of the Byzantine emperor Justinian I in the 6th century, when it was finally closed down. Egyptians, disaffected and weary after a series of foreign occupations, identified the story of the mother-goddess Isis protecting her child Horus with that of the Virgin Mary and her son Jesus escaping the emperor Herod.

Consequently, many sites believed to have been the resting places of the holy family during their sojourn in Egypt became sacred to the Egyptians. The visit of the holy family later circulated among Egyptian Christians as fulfillment of the Biblical prophecy "When Israel was a child, then I loved him, and called my son out of Egypt" (Hosea 11:1). The feast of the coming of the Lord of Egypt on June 1 became an important part of Christian Egyptian tradition. According to tradition, Christianity was brought to Egypt by Saint Mark the Evangelist in the early 40s of the 1st century, under the reign of the Roman emperor Nero. The earliest converts were Jews residing in Alexandria, a city which had by then become a center of culture and learning in the entire Mediterranean oikoumene.

St. Mark is said to have founded the Holy Apostolic See of Alexandria and to have become its first Patriarch. Within 50 years of St. Mark's arrival in Alexandria, a fragment of New Testament writings appeared in Oxyrhynchus (Bahnasa), which suggests that Christianity already began to spread south of Alexandria at an early date. By the mid-third century, a sizable number of Egyptians were persecuted by the Romans on account of having adopted the new Christian faith, beginning with the Edict of Decius. Christianity was tolerated in the Roman Empire until AD 284, when the Emperor Diocletian persecuted and put to death a great number of Christian Egyptians.

This event became a watershed in the history of Egyptian Christianity, marking the beginning of a distinct Egyptian or Coptic Church. It became known as the 'Era of the Martyrs' and is commemorated in the Coptic calendar in which dating of the years began with the start of Diocletian's reign. When Egyptians were persecuted by Diocletian, many retreated to the desert to seek relief. The practice precipitated the rise of monasticism, for which the Egyptians, namely St. Antony, St. Bakhum, St. Shenouda and St. Amun, are credited as pioneers. By the end of the 4th century, it is estimated that the mass of the Egyptians had either embraced Christianity or were nominally Christian.

The Catachetical School of Alexandria was founded in the 3rd century by Pantaenus, becoming a major school of Christian learning as well as science, mathematics and the humanities. The Psalms and part of the New Testament were translated at the school from Greek to Egyptian, which had already begun to be written in Greek letters with the addition of a number of demotic characters. This stage of the Egyptian language would later come to be known as Coptic along with its alphabet. The third theologian to head the Catachetical School was a native Egyptian by the name of Origen. Origen was an outstanding theologian and one of the most influential Church Fathers. He traveled extensively to lecture in various churches around the world and has many important texts to his credit including the Hexapla, an exegesis of various translations of the Hebrew Bible.

At the threshold of the Byzantine period, the New Testament had been entirely translated into Coptic. But while Christianity continued to thrive in Egypt, the old pagan beliefs which had survived the test of time were facing mounting pressure. The Byzantine period was particularly brutal in its zeal to erase any traces of ancient Egyptian religion. Under emperor Theodosius I, Christianity had already been proclaimed the religion of the Empire and all pagan cults were forbidden. When Egypt fell under the jurisdiction of Constantinople after the split of the Roman Empire, many ancient Egyptian temples were either destroyed or converted into monasteries.

One of the defining moments in the history of the Church in Egypt is a controversy that ensued over the nature of Jesus Christ which culminated in the final split of the Coptic Church from both the Byzantine and Roman Catholic Churches. The Council of Chalcedon convened in AD 451, signaling the Byzantine Empire's determination to assert its hegemony over Egypt. When it declared that Jesus Christ was of two natures embodied in Christ's person, the Egyptian reaction was swift, rejecting the decrees of the Council as incompatible with the Miaphysite doctrine of Coptic Orthodoxy. The Copts' upholding of the Miaphysite doctrine against the pro-Chalcedonian Greek Melkites had both theological and national implications. As Coptologist Jill Kamil notes, the position taken by the Egyptians "paved [the way] for the Coptic church to establish itself as a separate entity...No longer even spiritually linked with Constantinople, theologians began to write more in Coptic and less in Greek. Coptic art developed its own national character, and the Copts stood united against the imperial power."

Islamic period from Late antiquity to Middle Ages

Before the Muslim conquest of Egypt, the Byzantine Emperor Heraclius was able to reclaim the country after a brief Persian invasion in AD 616, and subsequently appointed Cyrus of Alexandria, a Chalcedonian, as Patriarch. Cyrus was determined to convert the Egyptian Miaphysites by any means. He expelled Coptic monks and bishops from their monasteries and sees. Many died in the chaos, and the resentment of the Egyptians against their Byzantine conquerors reached a peak.

Meanwhile, the new religion of Islam was making headway in Arabia, culminating in the Muslim conquests that took place following Muhammad's death. In AD 639, the Arab general 'Amr ibn al-'As marched into Egypt, facing off with the Byzantines in the Battle of Heliopolis that ended with the Byzantines' defeat. The relationship between the Greek Melkites and the Egyptian Copts had grown so bitter that most Egyptians did not put up heavy resistance against the Arabs.

The new Muslim rulers moved the capital to Fustat and, through the 7th century, retained the existing Byzantine administrative structure with Greek as its language. Native Egyptians filled administrative ranks and continued to worship freely so long as they paid the jizya poll tax, in addition to a land tax that all Egyptians irrespective of religion also had to pay. The authority of the Miaphysite doctrine of the Coptic Church was for the first time nationally recognized.

According to al-Ya'qubi, repeated revolts by Egyptian Christians against the Muslim Arabs took place in the 8th and 9th centuries under the reign of the Umayyads and Abbasids. The greatest was one in which disaffected Muslim Egyptians joined their Christian compatriots around AD 830 in an unsuccessful attempt to repel the Arabs. The Egyptian Muslim historian Ibn Abd al-Hakam spoke harshly of the Abbasids—a reaction that according to Egyptologist Okasha El-Daly can be seen "within the context of the struggle between proud native Egyptians and the central Abbasid caliphate in Iraq."

The form of Islam that eventually took hold in Egypt was Sunni, though very early in this period Egyptians began to blend their new faith with indigenous beliefs and practices that had survived through Coptic Christianity. Just as Egyptians had been pioneers in early monasticism so they were in the development of the mystical form of Islam, Sufism. Various Sufi orders were founded in the 8th century and flourished until the present day. One of the earliest Egyptian Sufis was Dhul-Nun al-Misri (i.e., Dhul-Nun the Egyptian). He was born in Akhmim in AD 796 and achieved political and social leadership over the Egyptian people.

Dhul-Nun was regarded as the Patron Saint of the Physicians and is credited with having introduced the concept of Gnosis into Islam, as well as of being able to decipher a number of hieroglyphic characters due to his knowledge of Coptic. He was keenly interested in ancient Egyptian sciences, and claimed to have received his knowledge of alchemy from Egyptian sources.

In the years to follow the Arab occupation of Egypt, a social hierarchy was created whereby Egyptians who converted to Islam acquired the status of mawali or "clients" to the ruling Arab elite, while those who remained Christian, the Copts, became dhimmis, but the Egyptians who converted to Islam were also called Copts until the Mamluk period. In time the power of the Arabs waned throughout the Islamic Empire so that in the 10th century, the Turkish Ikhshids were able to take control of Egypt and made it an independent political unit from the rest of the empire.

Egyptians continued to live socially and politically separate from their foreign conquerors, but their rulers like the Ptolemies before them were able to stabilize the country and bring renewed economic prosperity. It was under the Shiite Fatimids from the 10th to the 12th centuries that Muslim Egyptian institutions began to take form along with the Egyptian dialect of Arabic, which was to eventually slowly supplant native Egyptian or Coptic as the spoken language.

Al-Azhar was founded in AD 970 in the new capital Cairo, not very far from its ancient predecessor in Memphis. It became the preeminent Muslim center of learning in Egypt and by the Ayyubid period it had acquired a Sunni orientation. The Fatimids with some exceptions were known for their religious tolerance and their observance of local Muslim, Coptic and indigenous Egyptian festivals and customs. Under the Ayyubids, the country for the most part continued to prosper.

The Mamluks of Egypt (AD 1258–1517) as a whole were, some of the most enlightened rulers of Egypt, not only in the arts and in providing for the welfare of their subjects, but also in many other ways, such as efficient organisation of law and order and postal services, and the building of canals, roads, bridges and aqueducts. Though turbulent, often treacherous and brutal in their feuds, and politically and economically inept, the later Mameluks maintained the splendour and artistic traditions of their predecessors. The reign of Kait Bey (1468-1496) was one of high achievement in architecture, showing great refinement of taste in the building of elegant tombs, mosques and palaces. It was a period in which learning flourished.

By the 15th century most Egyptians had already been converted to Islam, while Coptic Christians were reduced to a minority. The Mamluks were mainly ethnic Circassians and Turks who had been captured as slaves then recruited into the army fighting on behalf of the Islamic empire. Native Egyptians were not allowed to serve in the army until the reign of Mohamed Ali. Historian James Jankwoski writes:

Ottoman period
Egyptians under the Ottoman Turks from the 16th to the 18th centuries lived within a social hierarchy similar to that of the Mamluks, Arabs, Romans, Greeks and Persians before them. Native Egyptians applied the term atrak (Turks) indiscriminately to the Ottomans and Mamluks, who were at the top of the social pyramid, while Egyptians, most of whom were farmers, were at the bottom. Frequent revolts by the Egyptian peasantry against the Ottoman-Mamluk Beys took place throughout the 18th century, particularly in Upper Egypt where the peasants at one point wrested control of the region and declared a separatist government.

The only segment of Egyptian society which appears to have retained a degree of power during this period were the Muslim 'ulama or religious scholars, who directed the religious and social affairs of the native Egyptian population and interceded on their behalf when dealing with the Turko-Circassian elite. It is also believed that during the late periods of the Ottoman era of Egypt, native Egyptians were allowed and required to join the army for the first time since the Roman period of Egypt, including Coptic Christians who were civil servants at the time of Mohammed Ali Pasha.

Modern history

Modern Egyptian history is generally believed to begin with the French expedition in Egypt led by Napoleon Bonaparte in 1798. The French defeated a Mamluk era army at the Battle of the Pyramids, and soon they were able to seize control of the country.

The French occupation was short-lived, ending when British troops drove out the French in 1801. Its impact on the social and cultural fabric of Egyptian society, however, was tremendous. The Egyptians were deeply hostile to the French, whom they viewed as yet another foreign occupation to be resisted. At the same time, the French expedition introduced Egyptians to the ideals of the French Revolution which were to have a significant influence on their own self-perception and realization of modern independence.

When Napoleon invited the Egyptian ulama to head a French-supervised government in Egypt, for some, it awakened a sense of nationalism and a patriotic desire for national independence from the Ottomans. In addition, the French introduced the printing press in Egypt and published its first newspaper. The monumental catalogue of Egypt's ecology, society and economy, Description de l'Égypte, was written by scholars and scientists who accompanied the French army on their expedition.

The withdrawal of French forces from Egypt left a power vacuum that was filled after a period of political turmoil by Mohammed Ali, an Ottoman officer of Albanian ethnicity. He rallied support among the Egyptians until he was elected by the native Muslim ulama as governor of Egypt. Mohammed Ali is credited for having undertaken a massive campaign of public works, including irrigation projects, agricultural reforms and the cultivation of cash crops (notably cotton, rice and sugar-cane), increased industrialization, and a new educational system—the results of which are felt to this day.

In order to consolidate his power in Egypt, Mohammed Ali worked to eliminate the Turko-Circassian domination of administrative and army posts. For the first time since the Roman period, native Egyptians filled the junior ranks of the country's army. The army would later conduct military expeditions in the Levant, Sudan, and against the Wahabis in Arabia. Many Egyptians student missions were sent to Europe in the early 19th century to study at European universities and acquire technical skills such as printing, shipbuilding, and modern military techniques. One of these students, whose name was Rifa'a et-Tahtawi (1801–1873), was the first in a long line of Egyptian intellectuals that started the modern Egyptian Renaissance.

Nationalism

The period between 1860–1940 was characterized by an Egyptian nahda, renaissance or rebirth. It is best known for the renewed interest in Egyptian antiquity and the cultural achievements that were inspired by it. Along with this interest came an indigenous, Egypt-centered orientation, particularly among the Egyptian intelligentsia that would affect Egypt's autonomous development as a sovereign and independent nation-state.

The first Egyptian renaissance intellectual was Rifa'a el-Tahtawi, who was born in the village of Tahta in upper Egypt. In 1831, Tahtawi undertook a career in journalism, education and translation. Three of his published volumes were works of political and moral philosophy. In them he introduces his students to Enlightenment ideas such as secular authority and political rights and liberty; his ideas regarding how a modern civilized society ought to be and what constituted by extension a civilized or "good Egyptian"; and his ideas on public interest and public good.

Tahtawi was instrumental in sparking indigenous interest in Egypt's ancient heritage. He composed a number of poems in praise of Egypt and wrote two other general histories of the country. He also co-founded with his contemporary Ali Mubarak, the architect of the modern Egyptian school system, a native Egyptology school that looked for inspiration to medieval Egyptian scholars like Suyuti and Maqrizi, who studied ancient Egyptian history, language and antiquities. Tahtawi encouraged his compatriots to invite Europeans to come and teach the modern sciences in Egypt, drawing on the example of Pharaoh Psamtek I who had enlisted the Greeks' help in organizing the Egyptian army.

Among Mohammed Ali's successors, the most influential was Isma'il Pasha who became khedive in 1863. Ismail's reign witnessed the growth of the army, major education reforms, the founding of the Egyptian Museum and the Royal Opera House, the rise of an independent political press, a flourishing of the arts, and the inauguration of the Suez Canal. In 1866, the Assembly of Delegates was founded to serve as an advisory body for the government. Its members were elected from across Egypt, including villages, which meant that native Egyptians came to exert increasing political and economic influence over their country. Several generations of Egyptians exposed to the ideas of constitutionalism made up the emerging intellectual and political milieu that slowly filled the ranks of the government, the army and institutions which had long been dominated by an aristocracy of Turks, Greeks, Circassians and Armenians.

Ismail's massive modernization campaign, however, left Egypt indebted to European powers, leading to increased European meddling in local affairs. This led to the formation of secret groups made up of Egyptian notables, ministers, journalists and army officers organized across the country to oppose the increasing European influence.

When the British deposed Ismail and installed his son Tawfik, the now Egyptian-dominated army reacted violently, staging a revolt led by Minister of War Ahmed Orabi, who was a rural Egyptian born in a village in Zagazig, self-styled el-Masri ('the Egyptian'), against the Khedive, the Turko-Circassian elite, and the European stronghold. The revolt was a military failure and British forces occupied Egypt in 1882. Technically, Egypt was still part of the Ottoman Empire with the Mohammed Ali family ruling the country, though now with British supervision and according to British directives. The Egyptian army was disbanded and a smaller army commanded by British officers was installed in its place.

Liberal age

Egyptian self-government, education, and the continued plight of Egypt's peasant majority deteriorated most significantly under British occupation. Slowly, an organized national movement for independence began to form. In its beginnings, it took the form of an Azhar-led religious reform movement that was more concerned with the social conditions of Egyptian society. It gathered momentum between 1882 and 1906, ultimately leading to a resentment against European occupation.

Sheikh Muhammad Abduh, the son of a Delta farmer who was briefly exiled for his participation in the Orabi revolt and a future Azhar Mufti, was its most notable advocate. Abduh called for a reform of Egyptian Muslim society and formulated the modernist interpretations of Islam that took hold among younger generations of Egyptians. Among these were Mustafa Kamil and Ahmed Lutfi el-Sayed, the architects of modern Egyptian nationalism. Mustafa Kamil had been a student activist in the 1890s involved in the creation of a secret nationalist society that called for British evacuation from Egypt. He was famous for coining the popular expression, "If I had not been an Egyptian, I would have wished to become one."

Egyptian nationalist sentiment reached a high point after the 1906 Dinshaway Incident, when following an altercation between a group of British soldiers and Egyptian farmers, four of the farmers were hanged while others were condemned to public flogging. Dinshaway, a watershed in the history of Egyptian anti-colonial resistance, galvanized Egyptian opposition against the British, culminating in the founding of the first two political parties in Egypt: the secular, liberal Umma (the Nation, 1907) headed by Ahmed Lutfi el-Sayed, and the more radical, pro-Islamic Watani Party (National Party, 1908) headed by Mustafa Kamil. Lutfi was born to a family of farmers in a village in the Delta province of Daqahliya in 1872. He was educated at al-Azhar where he attended lectures by Mohammed Abduh. Abduh came to have a profound influence on Lutfi's reformist thinking in later years. In 1907, he founded the Umma Party newspaper, el-Garida, whose statement of purpose read: "El-Garida is a purely Egyptian party which aims to defend Egyptian interests of all kinds."

Both the People and National parties came to dominate Egyptian politics until World War I, but the new leaders of the national movement for independence following four arduous years of war (in which Great Britain declared Egypt a British protectorate) were closer to the secular, liberal principles of Ahmed Lutfi el-Sayed and the People's Party. Prominent among these was Saad Zaghloul who led the new movement through the Wafd Party. Saad Zaghloul was born in a small Egyptian village, he held several ministerial positions before he was elected to the Legislative Assembly and organized a mass movement demanding an end to the British Protectorate. He garnered such massive popularity among the Egyptian people that he came to be known as 'Father of the Egyptians'. When on March 8, 1919 the British arrested Zaghloul and his associates and exiled them to Malta, the Egyptian people staged their first modern revolution. Demonstrations and strikes across Egypt became such a daily occurrence that normal life was brought to a halt.

The Wafd Party drafted a new Constitution in 1923 based on a parliamentary representative system. Saad Zaghloul became the first popularly elected Prime Minister of Egypt in 1924. Egyptian independence at this stage was provisional, as British forces continued to be physically present on Egyptian soil. In 1936, the Anglo-Egyptian Treaty was concluded. New forces that came to prominence were the Muslim Brotherhood and the radical Young Egypt Party. In 1920, Banque Misr (Bank of Egypt) was founded by Talaat Pasha Harb as "an Egyptian bank for Egyptians only", which restricted shareholding to native Egyptians and helped finance various new Egyptian-owned businesses.

Under the parliamentary monarchy, Egypt reached the peak of its modern intellectual Renaissance that was started by Rifa'a el-Tahtawi nearly a century earlier. Among those who set the intellectual tone of a newly independent Egypt, in addition to Muhammad Abduh and Ahmed Lutfi el-Sayed, were Qasim Amin, Muhammad Husayn Haykal, Taha Hussein, Abbas el-'Akkad, Tawfiq el-Hakeem, and Salama Moussa. They delineated a liberal outlook for their country expressed as a commitment to individual freedom, secularism, an evolutionary view of the world and faith in science to bring progress to human society.

When Egyptian novelist and Nobel Prize laureate Naguib Mahfouz died in 2006, many Egyptians felt that perhaps the last of the Greats of Egypt's golden age had died. In his dialogues with close associate and journalist Mohamed Salmawy, published as Mon Égypte, Mahfouz had this to say:

Republic

Increased involvement by King Farouk in parliamentary affairs, government corruption, and the widening gap between the country's rich and poor led to the eventual toppling of the monarchy and the dissolution of the parliament through a coup d'état by a group of army officers in 1952. The Egyptian Republic was declared on June 18, 1953 with General Muhammad Naguib as the first President of the Republic. After Naguib was forced to resign in 1954 and later put under house arrest by Gamal Abdel Nasser, the real architect of the 1952 movement, mass protests by Egyptians erupted against the forced resignation of what became a popular symbol of the new regime.

Nasser assumed power as President and began a nationalization process that initially had profound effects on the socioeconomic strata of Egyptian society. According to one historian, "Egypt had, for the first time since 343 BC, been ruled not by a Macedonian Greek, nor a Roman, nor an Arab, nor a Turk, but by an Egyptian."

Nasser nationalized the Suez Canal leading to the 1956 Suez Crisis. Egypt became increasingly involved in regional affairs until three years after the 1967 Six-Day War, in which Egypt lost the Sinai to Israel, Nasser died and was succeeded by Anwar Sadat. Sadat revived an Egypt Above All orientation, switched Egypt's Cold War allegiance from the Soviet Union to the United States, expelling Soviet advisors in 1972, and launched the Infitah economic reform policy. Like his predecessor, he also clamped down on religious and leftist opposition alike.

Egyptians fought one last time in the 1973 October War in an attempt to liberate Egyptian territories captured by Israel six years earlier. The October War presented Sadat with a political victory that later allowed him to regain the Sinai. In 1977, Sadat made a historic visit to Israel leading to the signing of the 1978 peace treaty, which was supported by the vast majority of Egyptians, in exchange for the complete Israeli withdrawal from Sinai. Sadat was assassinated in Cairo by members of the Egyptian Islamic Jihad in 1981, and was succeeded by Hosni Mubarak.

Hosni Mubarak was the president from 14 October 1981 to 11 February 2011, when he resigned under pressure of popular protest. Although power was ostensibly organized under a multi-party semi-presidential system, in practice it rested almost solely with the president. In late February 2005, for the first time since the 1952 coup d'état, the Egyptian people had an apparent chance to elect a leader from a list of various candidates, most prominently Ayman Nour. Most Egyptians were skeptical about the process of democratization and feared that power might ultimately be transferred to the president's first son, Gamal Mubarak.

After the resignation of Hosni Mubarak presidential powers were transferred to the Supreme Council of the Armed Forces, who relinquished power on 30 June 2012 when Islamist candidate Mohamed Morsi became the first democratically elected head of state in Egyptian history. After mass protests, he was deposed by a military coup a year after he came to power, and subsequently arrested and sentenced to death (later overturned), and died in prison six years later. The Muslim Brotherhood (officially listed as a terrorist group by Egypt after the coup) claimed that his death was due to being "prevented medicine and poor food." Morsi was also charged with leading an outlawed group, detention and torture of anti-government protesters, and committing treason by leaking state secrets.

In the 26–28 May 2014 Egyptian presidential election, former General Abdel Fattah el-Sisi won in a landslide, capturing 97% of the vote according to the government. Some regarded the election as undemocratic claiming that several political opponents were being detained or banned from running,, but: "The European Union's Election Observation Mission (EOM) released a preliminary statement on Thursday after voting commenced, stating that 'the Presidential Elections Commission (PEC) administered the election professionally and overall in line with the law'." In 2018 el-Sisi was re-elected with 97% of the vote, in an election denounced by human rights groups as unfair and "farcical". A BBC article mentioned that "Three potential candidates dropped out of the race, while a fourth - a former military chief - was arrested and accused of running for office without permission."

Languages

In the Early Dynastic Period, Nile Valley Egyptians spoke the Archaic Egyptian language. In antiquity, Egyptians spoke the Egyptian language. It constitutes its own branch of the Afroasiatic family. The Coptic language is the last form of the Egyptian language, written in Coptic alphabet which is based on the Greek alphabet. It is worth noting that other languages, such as Nubian, Arabic, and other Libyan languages also existed in Egypt outside of the Nile valley and in the mountains surrounding it since at least the time of Herodotus, with Arabic being used mainly in the Eastern Desert and Sinai, Nubian (referred to as Ethiopian By Herodotus) South of the first cataract of the Nile, and other Libyan Languages in the Libyan Desert

Although Arabic was spoken in parts of Egypt in the pre-islamic era such as the Eastern Desert and Sinai, Coptic was the Language of the majority of Egyptians residing in the Nile Valley. Arabic was adopted by the rulers of Egypt after the Islamic invasion as an official language. Gradually, Egyptian Arabic came to replace Coptic as the spoken language. Spoken Coptic was mostly extinct by the 17th century but may have survived in isolated pockets in Upper Egypt as late as the 19th century.

The official language of Egypt today is Arabic, but it is not a spoken language. The spoken vernaculars are Egyptian Arabic, Saʽidi Arabic, and their variants; and also Bedawi Arabic in the Sinai, and Western Egyptian Arabic in the Western desert. The most prestigious and widely spread vernacular is known as Cairene Arabic, being spoken by about 50% of the population, and the second, less prestigious, being Saidi Arabic, spoken by about 35-40% of the population. Modern Standard Arabic is reserved only for official documents, written educational material, and more formal contexts, and is not a naturally spoken language.

The recorded history of Egyptian Arabic as a dialect begins in Ottoman Egypt with a document by the 17th-century Moroccan author Yusuf Al-Maghribi during after his travels to Egypt writing about the peculiarities of the speech of the Egyptian people دفع الإصر عن كلام أهل مصر  (lit. "The Removal of the Burden from the Language of the People of Egypt") This suggests the language that by then was spoken in the majority of Miṣr (Egypt/Cairo). It's also worth noting that the Egyptians commonly referred to the modern day area of Greater Cairo (Cairo, Fustat, Giza, and their surroundings) by the name of "Miṣr", which was also the name used to refer to the entire land of Egypt. As a consequence, and because of the Egyptian habit of identifying people in the capital with the entire country's name, the word Miṣriyeen (Egyptian Arabic: Masreyeen) which is derived from the Quranic term Miṣr, the Hebrew Bible term Mitzrayim, and the Ancient Amarna tablets term Misri (lit. Land of Egypt) and Assyrian records called Egypt Mu-ṣur., commonly referred to the people of Egypt's Capital City, the greater Cairo area. It is represented in a body of vernacular literature comprising novels, plays and poetry published over the course of the nineteenth and twentieth centuries. Classical Arabic is also significant in Egyptian literary works, as Egyptian novelists and poets were among the first to experiment with modern styles of Arabic literature, and the forms they developed have been widely imitated.

While Egyptian Arabic is considered derived from the formal Arabic language, it has also been influenced by many other languages such as French, Turkish, and Italian. This is widely thought to be the effects of being the victim of several invasions, including that of the Ottoman Empire as well as the French invasion. As each invasion came and went, the Egyptians kept the few words and phrases that made the language seem easier. Egyptian Arabic is also influenced by Greek, and its grammar structure is influenced by the Coptic stage of the ancient Egyptian language.

It is also noteworthy that the Egyptian dialect is the most understood throughout the Arabic-speaking countries. This is because Egyptian movies and Egyptian music have been the most influential in the region and are therefore the most widespread, and also because of the political and cultural influence Egypt has on the region. As a result, most of the countries in the region have grown up listening to Egyptian Arabic and therefore have no trouble understanding it, even though they actually speak their own, but they tend to adopt many elements of Egyptian Arabic. This situation is not reciprocal, however, meaning that the Egyptians do not understand any of the dialects of the region.

Originally the Egyptians wrote in hieroglyphics. At first the meaning of the hieroglyphics was unknown, until in the year 1799 Napoleón Bonaparte's soldiers dug up the Rosetta stone. The Rosetta Stone was found broken and incomplete. It features 14 lines in the hieroglyphic script, 32 lines in Demotic, and 53 lines in Ancient Greek. Its decipherment lead to the understanding of the ancient Egyptian language.

Identity

Ancient Egypt
The categorization of people as Egyptians, Asiatics, Libyans and Nubians occurred in Egyptian documents of state ideology and were contingent on Social and Cultural factors among the ancient populations themselves.

Egypt and Africa
Even though Egypt is mostly located in North Africa, Egypt and the Egyptian people do not generally assert an African identity. In 2017, the National Geographic Genographic Project published a 10 years study on several nations where it revealed that Egypt is indeed a North African population, but African identity is not that common in Egypt and not many identify as African.

Ottoman Rule

Before the birth of Contemporary Egyptian Nationalism, which emerged in the period between 1860-1940, and throughout the Ottoman rule, Arabic-speaking nations under Ottoman rule were all referred to by Ottomans and Europeans as "Arabs", whether Egyptians, Sudanese, ..etc. During her stay in Upper Egypt, Lady Duff Gordon mentions the opinion of an Upper Egyptian man on the Ahmad Al Tayeb Uprising that happened during her stay. She puts what he said thus: "Truly in all the world none are miserable like us Arabs. The Turks beat us, and the Europeans hate us and say quite right. By God, we had better lay down our heads in the dust (die) and let the strangers take our land and grow cotton for themselves". However, as mentioned, there was a tendency in most European writings of that period to indiscriminately refer to Egyptians, Sudanese, and all Arabic-speaking nations, especially Muslims, as "Arabs", which is prevalent throughout the Letters of Lady Duff Gorden in which she reported the above, so it should be of note that this is her own translation of whatever the man said.

After Muhammed Ali Pasha took control of Egypt, along with Sudan and, briefly, parts of Arabia and the Levant, he enforced mandatory military service. The Egyptians were discriminated against in the military where they weren't allowed to hold any important positions. Throughout the Ottoman Empire, all Arabic speakers, especially Muslims, were called "Arabs". As a consequence, being called "Arab", as used by Ottomans and Europeans, was equivalent to being called Egyptian, Sudanese, ..etc, in modern day. In an attempt to prove to his soldiers that he is one of them, Ibrahim Pasha, the son of Mohammed Ali Pasha, who was an Albanian, told one of his soldiers after criticizing Turks: "I am not a Turk, I came to Egypt when I was a child, and since that time, its sun has changed my blood, and I became fully Arab".

Modern period
Beginning 1860, the state started making efforts to shape a collective Egyptian Identity and Egyptian nationalism in face of the British rule. However, the revolution of Ahmed Orabi is considered to be a turning point in Egyptian History, as it fought for the Egyptian identity, where Egyptians rejected any other identity, and identified only as Egyptians (Masreyeen). It is worth noting that in the past, Egyptians sometimes also used to refer to the area of Greater Cairo by the name of "Masr", which was also the name used to refer to the entire land of Egypt. As a consequence, and because of the Egyptian habit of identifying people with their city names, the word Misreyeen/Masreyeen sometimes referred to the people of the greater Cairo area. The Orabi movement in the 1870s and 1880s was the first major Egyptian nationalist movement that demanded an end to the alleged despotism of the Muhammad Ali family and demanded curbing the growth of European influence in Egypt, it campaigned under the nationalist slogan of "Egypt for Egyptians". The Orabi revolt is referred to in Egypt as the revolt of the fellahin (rural Egyptians), Ahmed Orabi himself was a rural Egyptian from a village in Zagazig.

Following the French campaign in Egypt, western ideas started becoming prevalent among Egyptian intellectuals , which continued after the British occupation of Egypt. Among the western ideas, the French Enlightenment notion of reviving Pre-Christian civilizations and cultures found a special place among Egyptian Nationalists , who sought to revive the Pharaonic culture as the main pre-Islamic/pre-Christian civilization of Egypt. Questions of identity came to fore in the late 19th century and in the 20th century as Egyptians sought to free themselves from British occupation, leading to the rise of ethno-territorial secular Egyptian nationalism (also known as "Pharaonism"). After Egyptians gained their independence from Great Britain, other political ideologies that were rejected earlier by the Egyptians, such as pan-Arabism, were adopted by the political leadership, there was also a rise of Islamism.

"Pharaonism" rose to political prominence in the 1920s and 1930s as an Egyptian movement resisting the British occupation, as Egypt developed separately from the Arab world. A segment of Egyptian intellectuals argued that Egypt was part of a Mediterranean civilization. This ideology largely developed out of the country's lengthy pre-Islamic pre-Arabism history, the relative isolation of the Nile Valley and the mostly homogeneous indigenous non-Arab genetic ancestry/ethnicity of the inhabitants, regardless of current religious identity. One of Pharaonism's most notable advocates was Taha Hussein who remarked:

Pharaonism became the dominant mode of expression of Egyptian anti-colonial activists of the pre-war and inter-war periods. In 1931, following a visit to Egypt, Syrian Arab nationalist Sati' al-Husri remarked that:

The later 1930s would become a formative period for Arab nationalism without the involvement of Egypt. Arab nationalism developed as a regional nationalism initially based on the efforts of Syrian, Palestinian, and Lebanese political intellectuals.

Arab-Islamic political sentiment was fueled by the solidarity felt between, on the one hand, Egyptians struggling for independence from Britain and, on the other hand, those across the Arab world engaged in similar anti-imperialist struggles. In particular, the growth of Zionism in neighboring Palestine was seen as a threat by many Egyptians, and the cause of resistance there was adopted by rising Islamic movements such as the Muslim Brotherhood as well as the political leadership including King Faruq I and the Egyptian Prime Minister Mustafa el-Nahhas.

Historian H. S. Deighton wrote:

Until the 1940s, Egypt was more in favour of territorial Egyptian nationalism and distant from the pan-Arabism ideology. Egyptians generally did not identify themselves as Arabs, and it is revealing that when the Egyptian nationalist leader Saad Zaghloul met the Arab delegates at Versailles in 1918, he insisted that their struggles for statehood were not connected, maintaining that the problem of Egypt was an Egyptian problem and not an Arab one.

Nasserism
It was not until the Nasser era more than a decade later that Arab nationalism, and by extension Arab socialism, became a state policy and a means with which to define Egypt's position in the Middle East and the world, usually articulated vis-à-vis Zionism in the neighboring new state of Israel. Nasser's politics was shaped by his conviction that all the Arab states were contending with anti-imperialist struggles and thus solidarity between them was imperative for independence. He viewed the earlier Egyptian nationalism of Saad Zaghloul as too inward-looking and saw no conflict between Egyptian patriotism (wataniyya) and Arab nationalism (qawmiyya).

For a while Egypt and Syria formed the United Arab Republic (UAR), which lasted for about 3 years. When the union was dissolved, Egypt continued to be known as the UAR until 1971, when Egypt adopted the current official name, the Arab Republic of Egypt. The Egyptians' attachment to Arabism was particularly questioned after the 1967 Six-Day War. Thousands of Egyptians had lost their lives, and the country became disillusioned with Arab politics. Although the Arabism instilled in the country by Nasser was not deeply embedded in society, a certain kinship with the rest of the Arab world was firmly established and Egypt saw itself as the leader of this larger cultural entity. Nasser's version of pan-Arabism stressed Egyptian sovereignty and leadership of Arab unity instead of the eastern Arab states.

Nasser's successor Anwar el-Sadat, both through public policy and his peace initiative with Israel, revived an uncontested Egyptian orientation, unequivocally asserting that only Egypt and Egyptians were his responsibility. According to Dawisha, the terms "Arab", "Arabism" and "Arab unity", save for the new official name, became conspicuously absent. (See also Liberal age and Republic sections.) However, despite Sadat's systematic attempts to root out Arab sentiment, Arab nationalism in Egypt remained a potent force.

During this era, in 1978, Egyptian-American sociologist Saad Eddin Ibrahim studied the national discourse between 17 Egyptian intellectuals relating to Egypt's identity and peace with Israel. He noted that in 18 articles Arab identity was acknowledged and neutrality in the conflict opposed, while in eight articles Arab identity was acknowledged and neutrality supported and only in three articles written by author Louis Awad was Arab identity rejected and neutrality supported. Egyptian scholar Gamal Hamdan stressed that Egyptian identity was unique, but that Egypt was the center and "cultural hub" of the Arab world, arguing that "Egypt in the Arab world is like Cairo in Egypt." Hamdan further contended "We do not see the Egyptian personality, no matter how distinct it may be, as anything other than a part of the personality of the greater Arab homeland."

Many Egyptians today feel that Egyptian and Arab identities are inextricably linked, and emphasize the central role that Egypt plays in the Arab world. Others continue to believe that Egypt and Egyptians are simply not Arab, emphasizing indigenous Egyptian heritage, culture and independent polity, pointing to the perceived failures of Arab and pan-Arab nationalist policies. Egyptian anthropologist Laila el-Hamamsy illustrates the modern-day relationship between the two trends, stating: "in light of their history, Egyptians ... should be conscious of their national identity and consider themselves, above all, Egyptians. How is the Egyptian, with this strong sense of Egyptian identity, able to look himself as an Arab too?" Her explanation is that Egyptianization translated as Arabization with the result being "an increased tempo of Arabization, for facility in the Arabic language opened the windows into the rich legacy of Arabic culture. ... Thus in seeking a cultural identity, Egypt has revived its Arab cultural heritage."

Culture

Egyptian culture boasts five millennia of recorded history. Ancient Egypt was among the earliest and greatest civilizations during which the Egyptians maintained a strikingly complex and stable culture that influenced later cultures of Europe, the Near East and Africa. After the Pharaonic era, the Egyptians themselves came under the influence of Hellenism, Christianity and Islamic culture. Today, many aspects of ancient Egyptian culture exist in interaction with newer elements, including the influence of modern Western culture, itself influenced by Ancient Egypt.

Surnames
 
Today, Egyptians carry names that have Ancient Egyptian, Arabic, Turkish, Greek and Western meanings (especially Coptic ones) among others. The concept of a surname is lacking in Egypt. Rather, Egyptians tend to carry their father's name as their first middle name, and stop at the 2nd or 3rd first name, which thus becomes one's surname. In this manner, surnames continuously change with generations, as first names of 4th or 5th generations get dropped.

Some Egyptians tend to have Surnames based on their cities, like Monoufi (from Monufia), Banhawy (from Benha), Aswany (from Aswan), Tahtawy (from Tahta), Fayoumi (from Fayoum), Eskandarani / Eskandar (from Alexandria) and so on.

As a result of the Islamic history of Egypt, and as a result of the subsequent Arabization, some Egyptians adopted historical Berber, Arabic, and Iranian names. For example, the surname "Al Juhaini", from the Arabic Juhainah, which is very rare, except from a few instances in North Egypt, the surname "Al Hawary", from the Berber Hawara. The concept of surname, however, is extremely rare in Egypt, and the mentioned surnames are extremely rare. Historical Arabic names in general are most likely just historically adopted as status names, which is something that happened with Greek names as well in Greek-Roman times where Egyptians would adopt Greek names as status names.

Some Egyptians have their family names based on their traditional crafts, like El Nagar (Carpenter), El Fawal (the one who sells Foul), El Hadad (Blacksmith), El Khayat (Tailor), and so on.

The majority of Egyptians, however, have last names that are their great-grandparents' first names, this habit is especially dominant among the fellahin (rural Egyptians), where the concept of surnames isn't really a strong tradition. For example, if a person named "Khaled Emad Salama Ali" has a son named "Ashraf", his son's full name may become "Ashraf Khaled Emad Salama". Thus, a son may have a last name that is different from his father's last name.

However, it is not unusual for many Egyptian families to adopt Ancient Egyptian based names (especially Coptic ones) and have their first names or surnames beginning with the Ancient Egyptian masculine possessive pronoun pa (generally ba in Arabic, which lost the phoneme  in the course of developing from Proto-Semitic, but the Egyptians still have the phoneme /p/ in their spoken language). For example, Bashandy ( "the one of acacia"), Bakhoum ( "the one of eagle"), Bekhit ( "the one of the north"), Bahur ( "the one of Horus") and Banoub ( "the one of Anubis").

The name Shenouda, which is very common among Copts, means "child of God". Hence, names and many toponyms may end with -nouda, -noudi or -nuti, which means Of God in Egyptian and Coptic. In addition, Egyptian families often derive their name from places in Egypt, such as Minyawi from Minya and Suyuti from Asyut; or from one of the local Sufi orders such as el-Shazli and el-Sawy. More examples of prominent surnames are Qozman and Habib.

With the adoption of Christianity and eventually Islam, Egyptians began to take on names associated with these religions. Many Egyptian surnames also became Hellenized and Arabized, meaning they were altered to sound Greek or Arabic. This was done by the addition of the Greek suffix -ios to Egyptian names such as, for example, Pakhom to Pakhomios; or by adding the Egyptian Arabic definite article el to Egyptian names such as, for example, Bayoumi to el-Bayoumi; Bayoumi, without the article, is even more common.

Names starting with the Ancient Egyptian affix pu ("of the place of") were sometimes Arabized to abu ("father of"); for example, Busiri ("of the place of Osiris") occasionally became Abusir and el-Busiri. Few people might also have surnames like el-Shamy ("the Levantine"), suggesting a possible Levantine origin, or, in the upper classes, Dewidar, suggesting a possible Ottoman-Mamluk remnant, but these names are very rare and could also be just historically adopted as status names. Conversely, some Levantines might carry the surname el-Masri ("the Egyptian") suggesting a possible Egyptian extraction.

The Egyptian peasantry, the fellahin (rural Egyptians), are more likely to retain indigenous names given their relative isolation throughout the Egyptian people's history.

With French influence, names like Mounier, Pierre, and many others became common, more so in the Christian community.

Genetic history

Beginning in the predynastic period, some differences between the populations of Upper and Lower Egypt were ascertained through their skeletal remains, suggesting a gradual clinal pattern north to south.

When Lower and Upper Egypt were unified c. 3200 BC, the distinction began to blur, resulting in a more homogeneous population in Egypt, though the distinction remains true to some degree to this day. Some biological anthropologists such as Shomarka Keita believe the range of variability to be primarily indigenous and not necessarily the result of significant intermingling of widely divergent peoples. In 2005, Keita examined Badarian crania from predynastic upper Egypt in comparison to various European and tropical African crania. He found that the predynastic Badarian series clustered much closer with the tropical African series. The comparative samples were selected based on "Brace et al.’s (1993) comments on the affinities of an upper Egyptian/Nubian epipalaeolithic series".

Keita describes the northern and southern patterns of the early predynastic period as "northern-Egyptian-Maghreb" and "tropical African variant" (overlapping with Nubia/Kush) respectively. He shows that a progressive change in Upper Egypt toward the northern Egyptian pattern takes place through the predynastic period. The southern pattern continues to predominate in Abydos, Upper Egypt by the First Dynasty, but "lower Egyptian, North African, and European patterns are observed also, thus making for great diversity." A group of noted physical anthropologists conducted craniofacial studies of Egyptian skeletal remains and concluded similarly that "the Egyptians have been in place since back in the Pleistocene and have been largely unaffected by either invasions or migrations. As others have noted, Egyptians are Egyptians, and they were so in the past as well."Genetic analysis of modern Egyptians reveals that they have paternal lineages common to indigenous North-East African populations primarily and to Near Eastern peoples to a lesser extent—these lineages would have spread during the Neolithic and were maintained by the predynastic period. University of Chicago Egyptologist Frank Yurco suggested a historical, regional and ethnolinguistic continuity, asserting that "the mummies and skeletons of ancient Egyptians indicate they were similar to the modern Egyptians and other people of the Afro-Asiatic ethnic grouping".

Another study found that the average Egyptian male has 85% Native North African ancestry, Both Egyptian Christians and Muslim were found to be closely related and stem from the same grandparents according to a 2020 study by Forensic science international 313, adding a quote "Therefore, from these results we conclude that Egyptian Muslims and Egyptian Christians genetically originate from the same ancestors"A 2006 bioarchaeological study on the dental morphology of ancient Egyptians by Prof. Joel Irish shows dental traits characteristic of indigenous North Africans and to a lesser extent Southwest Asian and European populations. Among the samples included in the study is skeletal material from the Hawara tombs of Fayum, which clustered very closely with the Badarian series of the predynastic period. All the samples, particularly those of the Dynastic period, were significantly divergent from a neolithic West Saharan sample from Lower Nubia. Biological continuity was also found intact from the dynastic to the post-pharaonic periods. According to Irish:
[The Egyptian] samples [996 mummies] exhibit morphologically simple, mass-reduced dentitions that are similar to those in populations from greater North Africa (Irish, 1993, 1998a–c, 2000) and, to a lesser extent, western Asia and Europe (Turner, 1985a; Turner and Markowitz, 1990; Roler, 1992; Lipschultz, 1996; Irish, 1998a). Similar craniofacial measurements among samples from these regions were reported as well (Brace et al., 1993)... an inspection of MMD values reveals no evidence of increasing phenetic distance between samples from the first and second halves of this almost 3,000-year-long period. For example, phenetic distances between First-Second Dynasty Abydos and samples from Fourth Dynasty Saqqara (MMD ¼ 0.050), 11–12th Dynasty Thebes (0.000), 12th Dynasty Lisht (0.072), 19th Dynasty Qurneh (0.053), and 26th–30th Dynasty Giza (0.027) do not exhibit a directional increase through time... Thus, despite increasing foreign influence after the Second Intermediate Period, not only did Egyptian culture remain intact (Lloyd, 2000a), but the people themselves, as represented by the dental samples, appear biologically constant as well... Gebel Ramlah [Neolithic Nubian/Western Desert sample] is, in fact, significantly different from Badari based on the 22-trait MMD (Table 4). For that matter, the Neolithic Western Desert sample is significantly different from all others [but] is closest to predynastic and early dynastic samples.

A study by Schuenemann et al. (2017) described the extraction and analysis of DNA from 151 mummified ancient Egyptian individuals, whose remains were recovered from Abusir el-Meleq in Middle Egypt. The specimens were living in a period stretching from the late New Kingdom to the Roman era (1388 BCE–426 CE). Complete mitochondrial DNA (mtDNA) sequences were obtained for 90 of the mummies and were compared with each other and with several other ancient and modern datasets. The scientists found that the ancient Egyptian individuals in their own dataset possessed highly similar mitochondrial profiles throughout the examined period. Modern Egyptians generally shared this maternal haplogroup pattern. The study was able to measure the mitochondrial DNA of 90 individuals, and it showed that the mitochondrial DNA composition of Egyptian mummies has shown a high level of affinity with the DNA of the populations of the Near East and North African populations and had significantly more affinity with south-eastern Europeans than with sub-Saharan Africans. Genome-wide data could only be successfully extracted from three of these individuals. Of these three, the Y-chromosome haplogroups of two individuals could be assigned to the Middle-Eastern haplogroup J, and one to haplogroup E1b1b1 common in North Africa. The absolute estimates of sub-Saharan African ancestry in these three individuals ranged from 6 to 15%, which is slightly less than the level of sub-Saharan African ancestry in modern Egyptians (the modern Egyptian samples were taken from Cairo and the Bahariya Oasis), which ranged from 14 to 21%. The ranges depend on the method and choice of reference populations. The study's authors cautioned that the mummies may not be representative of the ancient Egyptian population as a whole, since they were recovered from the northern part of middle Egypt.

Professor Stephen Quirke, an Egyptologist at University College London, expressed caution about the paper by Schuenemann et al. (2017), saying that “There has been this very strong attempt throughout the history of Egyptology to disassociate ancient Egyptians from the modern [Egyptian] population.” He added that he was “particularly suspicious of any statement that may have the unintended consequences of asserting—yet again from a Northern European or North American perspective—that there’s a discontinuity there [between ancient and modern Egyptians]". Gourdine et al criticised the methodology of the Scheunemann et al study and argued that the Sub-Saharan "genetic affinities" may be attributed to "early settlers" and "the relevant Sub-Saharan genetic markers" do not correspond with the geography of known trade routes".

In 2022, Danielle Candelora noted several limitations with the 2017 Scheunemann et al study such as its “untested sampling methods, small sample size and problematic comparative data” which she argued had been misused to legitimise racist conceptions of Ancient Egypt with “scientific evidence”.

In 2022, S.O.Y. Keita analysed 8 Short Tandem loci (STR) published data from studies by Hawass et al. 2010;2012 which sought to determine familial relations and research pathological features such as potential, infectious diseases among the New Kingdom royal mummies which included Tutankhamun and Rameses III. Keita, using an algorithm that only has three choices: Eurasians, Sub-Saharan Africans, and East Asians concluded that the studies showed “a majority to have an affinity with “Sub-Saharan” Africans in one affinity analysis”. However, Keita cautioned that this does not mean that the royal mummies “lacked other affiliations” which he argued had been obscured in typological thinking. Keita further added that different “data and algorithms might give different results” which reflected the complexity of biological heritage and the associated interpretation.

In 2023, Christopher Ehret reported that the biological anthropological findings from the “major burial sites of those founding locales of ancient Egypt in the fourth millennium BCE, notably El-Badari as well as Naqada, show no demographic indebtedness to the Levant”. Ehret specified that these studies revealed cranial and dental affinities with "closest parallels" to other longtime populations in the surrounding areas of northeastern Africa “such as Nubia and the northern Horn of Africa”. He further commented that the Naqada and Badarian populations did not migrate “from somewhere else but were descendants of the long-term inhabitants of these portions of Africa going back many millennia”.

See also

 Sa'idi people
 Nubian people
 Beja people
 Siwi people
Religion in Egypt
List of Egyptians
Egyptian Americans
Egyptians in the United Kingdom
Egyptian diaspora
Egyptians in Italy

References

Bibliography

Further reading

Egyptian people
Ethnic groups in Egypt
Ethnic groups in the Middle East
North African people